Animation is an album by pianist Cedar Walton recorded in 1978 and released on the Columbia label.

Reception

Allmusic awarded the album 2½ stars.

Track listing 
All compositions by Cedar Walton except as indicated
 "Animation" - 5:00
 "Jacob's Ladder" - 5:44
 "Charmed Circle" - 5:22
 "Another Star" (Stevie Wonder) - 5:43
 "Precious Mountain" - 4:59
 "March of the Fishman" - 4:36
 "If It Could Happen" (Tony Dumas) - 5:19
 "Ala Eduardo" - 5:00

Personnel 
Cedar Walton - piano, electric piano, arranger 
Steve Turre - trombone, bass trombone
Bob Berg - tenor saxophone
Tony Dumas - electric bass
Al Foster (tracks 1, 3 & 4), Buddy Williams - drums
Paulinho Da Costa - percussion

References 

Cedar Walton albums
1978 albums
Columbia Records albums
Albums recorded at Electric Lady Studios
Albums produced by George Butler (record producer)